Poi Solla Porom is a 2008 Tamil comedy film directed by A. L. Vijay. It is a remake of the Hindi film Khosla Ka Ghosla  and stars Karthik Kumar, debutante Piaa Bajpai, and Nedumudi Venu, alongside an ensemble supporting cast including Omar Lateef, Justina, Lakshmi Ramakrishnan, Cochin Haneefa, Nassar, Bosskey, John Vijay, and Moulee. The music was composed by M. G. Sreekumar with editing done by Anthony and cinematography by Aravind Krishna. The film released on 12 September 2008. The story is loosely based on real-life famous landgrabber and land shark E.V.PerumalSamy Reddy of EVP Film city based out of chennai who is famous for forging documents to take possession of others land.

Plot
K. R. Sathyanathan (Nedumudi Venu) is a typical middle-class man who has just retired. He wants to buy a plot of land in the city and move in with his wife Saradha (Lakshmi Ramakrishnan) and children: Uppilinathan alias Uppili (Karthik Kumar), Vishwanathan alias Vicha (Omar Lateef), and Sindhu (Justina). However, Uppili, who is a software engineer, has no interest in the house and is keen to leave India for New York, where he has obtained a job.

Sathyanathan buys the plot from "World Famous Properties", which is managed by Vijayakumar (Cochin Haneefa). When he goes to break stone to build his house, he finds a compound wall erected over his plot with the nameplate saying "Baby Properties". After numerous attempts to meet him, Sathyanathan finally meets Baby (Nassar), who wants him to pay half of the amount paid for the plot to be paid to Baby in order to vacate the plot. The Sathyanathan family tries to think of multiple solutions and finally resorts to hiring thugs to break the compound at night. Sathyanathan is arrested the next morning.

Through all this, Uppili's attitude towards his father's problem changes when he sees how attached he is to the property. Uppili meets his travel agent named Asif Iqbal alias Asif Bhai (Bosskey) to cancel the US trip. Asif reveals that he was once Baby's assistant and was cheated by him of his ancestral land. Uppili, with the help his girlfriend Amrutha (Piaa Bajpai) and Asif, convinces Daddy (Moulee), who is a stage actor and has 136 awards, to act as Varma, an NRI businessman from Dubai who has to India to sell a plot which actually belongs to the fisheries board of government.  At last, Baby pays Varma, the advance amount (35 lakhs) for the fishery land and the Sathyanathan family uses that money to get their land.

The film ends with Sathyanathan's family living happily ever after. Baby's assistant Johnny (John Vijay) reveals that there is no man in the name of Varma and the land belongs to the state government. Baby acknowledges that he has been cheated and decides to cover it up to preserve his reputation.

Cast

 Karthik Kumar as Uppilinathan alias Uppili, a software engineer who wants to leave India for New York
 Piaa Bajpai as Amrutha (voice dubbed by Suchitra), Uppili's girlfriend who helps him convince Daddy to act as Varma
 Nedumudi Venu as K. R. Sathyanathan (voice dubbed by Rajesh), a retiree and middle-class man
 Omar Lateef as Vishwanathan alias Vicha, Sathyanathan's son
 Justina as Sindhu, Sathyanathan's daughter
 Lakshmi Ramakrishnan as Saradha, Sathyanathan's wife
 Cochin Haneefa as Vijayakumar, a man who owns "World Famous Properties"
 Nassar as Baby, a man who owns "Baby Properties" and a fishery land
 Bosskey as Asif Iqbal (Asif Bhai), a travel agent and Baby's assistant who was cheated by him
 John Vijay as Johnny, Baby's assistant
 Moulee as "Daddy" or Chandra Mohan, a stage actor who acts as an NRI businessman named Varma
 Delhi Ganesh as Principal
 Aravind Krishna as Police Inspector
 Balaji Venugopal as Stage Director or Sharmaji, who acts as Varma's assistant
 George Maryan as Muthu Karuppan

Production
After Kireedam, Priyadarshan approached Vijay to remake the Hindi film Khosla Ka Ghosla in Tamil under his production house and hence they collaborated to make Poi Solla Porom. The film was completed within 34 days, with a cast containing veteran actors such as Nassar and Nedumudi Venu as well as relative newcomers including Karthik Kumar and Piaa Bajpai. The film also became one of the first ventures in Tamil cinema to feature a promotional song, with Vijay maintaining that the song reflected the story of the film.

Soundtrack
The music was composed by M. G. Sreekumar, who made his debut as composer with this film, while another Malayalam composer, Gopi Sundar, composed the film score. Title song was not included in the film instead it was used as promotional song, the song was blatantly ripped off from Hindi song "Chak De Phatte" from the original Hindi film.

 "Poi Solla Porom" - Jassie Gift
 "Gandhi Note Kaiyil" - Kailash Kher
 "Indha Payanthil" - Swetha Mohan
 "Indha Payanathil" II - Ranjith
 "Oru Vaarthai Pesamal" - Shreya Ghoshal
 "Kannamoochi Aattam" - Karthik

Critical reception
The film won positive reviews from critics with The Hindu citing that "Vijay’s dialogue, both humorous and thought-provoking, tickles the viewer almost throughout" and that "Vijay has understood the pulse of the audience even while sticking to his stand of providing standard fare".

References

External links
 
 

2008 films
Tamil remakes of Hindi films
Films directed by A. L. Vijay
2000s Tamil-language films
UTV Motion Pictures films
Indian comedy-drama films
Films set in Chennai
Films shot in Chennai
2008 comedy-drama films